Tom Gulbrandsen (born 5 May 1964) is a retired Norwegian football midfielder and later manager.

He is the father of Fredrik Gulbrandsen.

References

1964 births
Living people
People from Modum
Norwegian footballers
Mjøndalen IF players
Lillestrøm SK players
SV Ried players
Hønefoss BK players
Association football midfielders
Eliteserien players
Austrian Football Bundesliga players
Norwegian expatriate footballers
Expatriate footballers in Austria
Norwegian expatriate sportspeople in Austria
Norway under-21 international footballers
Norway international footballers
Norwegian football managers
Lillestrøm SK non-playing staff
Hønefoss BK managers
Sportspeople from Viken (county)